Rajendra Smriti Sangrahalaya (Rajendra Memorial Museum) is a small biographical museum and a heritage building located in city of Patna, Bihar, India. It is dedicated to the life and works of Dr. Rajendra Prasad, the first president of India.

References

Museums in Patna
Tourist attractions in Patna
Biographical museums in India
Memorials to Rajendra Prasad
1963 establishments in Bihar
Museums established in 1963